A Motorola connector also known as a motorola antenna plug, a male DIN 41585, or simply a DIN connector, is a common coaxial cable RF connector used primarily in the automotive industry for connecting the coaxial feedline from the antenna to the radio receiver.  It is also sometimes used for connecting scanner antennas to scanners. The male plug somewhat resembles an RCA connector in size and shape, but instead of surrounding the pin, the sleeve is "folded" back over the coax.
 
The pin is usually soldered to the center conductor of the coaxial cable coming from the antenna, although solderless versions exist with a screw against the centre connector.  The grounded side forms a 1.5 inch (38 mm) long sleeve around the coax. The sleeve usually contains one or more longitudinal spring surfaces, which provide reliable electrical contact by wiping against the mating female socket.

See also
RCA connector
TV aerial plug
F connector

References

In-car entertainment
RF connectors